Jake Cooper (born 2 January 2001), also known as Jake Southern-Cooper, is a professional footballer who plays as a defender for National League North club Darlington, on loan from  club Altrincham.

Cooper began his career with Sheffield United before joining Rotherham United's academy. He made his senior debut in the 2019–20 EFL Trophy, and spent time on loan at Gateshead, Hartlepool United and Darlington, before joining Altrincham, also on loan, in February 2022. Cooper was born in England and has been involved with Republic of Ireland squads at youth level.

Life and career
Cooper was born in 2001 in Burnley, Lancashire, and raised in Sheffield, South Yorkshire. He was on the books of Sheffield United as a striker until the under-14s, but played as a centre back for Sheffield Boys and it was in that position that he joined Rotherham United in 2015. He took up a two-year scholarship in 2017. With several first-team players unavailable through injury or suspension, Cooper was named among the substitutes for the EFL Championship match at home to Preston North End on 1 January 2019, but remained unused.

Cooper signed a one-year professional contract in June 2019, and made his senior debut as a starter in the EFL Trophy against Manchester United U21 in August. He played twice more in the EFL Trophy, and was an unused substitute in four cup ties and six League One matches, before joining National League North club Gateshead on an initial one-month loan on 7 December.

He made his debut the same day, "slott[ing] in seamlessly at the back" in a 3–5–2 formation as Gateshead beat Alfreton Town 3–1 to secure their first win in six attempts. After the loan was extended to the end of the season, he scored his first goal "with a finish a seasoned striker would have been delighted with" on 1 February 2020 as Gateshead beat Leamington 4–2 to climb into the play-off positions. Player-manager and defensive partner Mike Williamson highlighted how Cooper "fitted perfectly into a back three, [and] has been very consistent", rating him a Championship player in the making. Rotherham extended Cooper's contract by two years in March 2020 before allowing him to return to Gateshead in July for the play-offs. He opened the scoring in the quarter-final in first-half stoppage time, but Brackley Town's Shane Byrne equalised from his own half immediately following the kick-off. Cooper converted his kick as Gateshead won 6–5 on penalties, but they lost in the semi-finals to Boston United.

Cooper returned to Gateshead for the first half of the 2020–21 season, made 13 appearances, and expressed gratitude for the regular football that he felt had "improved [him] massively". He was an unused substitute in one Championship match for Rotherham before joining National League club Hartlepool United on loan in early March. Manager Dave Challinor made it clear that he was there as cover, and hoped "we don't need him too much for the foreseeable future". This proved to be the case, as he made only two appearances from a possible twenty.

In August 2021, he signed on loan at Darlington. The team had started the National North season poorly defensively, and Cooper made what manager Alun Armstrong called an outstanding start to his Darlington career. However, his desire for regular football was soon thwarted when he was sent off against York City and the resulting three-match ban was upheld on appeal. He had an eventful game against Kettering Town on 6 November: attempting to head the ball back to his goalkeeper after 8 minutes, he placed it over him for an own goal, gave his side the lead after 64, also with a header, and was fouled for a late penalty, converted by Will Hatfield to complete a 3–1 win.

On 1 February 2022, Cooper signed on an initial month's loan with National League club Altrincham, to reinforce the team's "leaky" defence. The loan was extended to the end of the season, and he made 12 appearances (11 starts) and scored once, in a 5–0 defeat of Weymouth, showing himself to be "solid and reliable defensively, and comfortable bringing the ball forward". Cooper was released by Rotherham United at the end of the 2021–22 season, and then rejoined Altrincham on a permanent basis.

After injury interrupted his progress at Altrincham, Cooper rejoined Darlington on a month's loan on 24 February 2023.

Career statistics

References

2001 births
Living people
Footballers from Burnley
Footballers from Sheffield
English footballers
Association football defenders
Sheffield United F.C. players
Rotherham United F.C. players
Gateshead F.C. players
Hartlepool United F.C. players
Darlington F.C. players
Altrincham F.C. players
National League (English football) players